ICI-85966 (former tentative brand name Stilbostat), also known as diethylstilbestrol (DES) bis(di(2-chloroethyl)carbamate), is a synthetic, nonsteroidal estrogen and cytostatic antineoplastic agent of the stilbestrol group and a nitrogen mustard ester of diethylstilbestrol (DES) which was developed for the treatment of breast cancer and prostate cancer but was never marketed (possibly due to the toxicity of DES).

See also
 List of hormonal cytostatic antineoplastic agents
 List of estrogen esters

References

Abandoned drugs
Antineoplastic drugs
Estrogen esters
Hormonal antineoplastic drugs
Carbamates
Phenols
Synthetic estrogens
Chloroethyl compounds